François de Bourbon, Duke of Châtellerault (1492 – 13 September 1515) was a French prince du sang from the House of Bourbon-Montpensier, a cadet branch of the House of Bourbon (itself a cadet branch of the Capetian dynasty). He was the brother of Louis II, Count of Montpensier, Charles III, Duke of Bourbon (also known as The Constable of Bourbon), Louise de Bourbon, Duchess of Montpensier, and Renée of Bourbon (who became Duchess of Lorraine on 26 June 1515, less than three months before François's untimely death).

Life

François de Bourbon was the third and youngest son of Gilbert de Bourbon, the Count of Montpensier, and his noble Italian wife Clara Gonzaga, with both of François's parents dying before he even became a teenager. François fought loyally under the command of his elder brother Charles in Guyenne and Navarre and was rewarded and compensated for his services by Francis I of France (through letters patent) with the Duchy of Châtellerault (named after the French city of Châtellerault, alternatively spelled Chatellraud, in Nouvelle-Aquitaine) in February 1514. François de Bourbon was killed in action on 13 September 1515 at the Battle of Marignano (in what is now the northern Italian city of Melegnano, in Lombardy) against the Swiss during the Italian Wars. After François's untimely death, his elder brother Charles, who was already Duke of Bourbon, inherited the Duchy of Châtellerault. After Charles's death in 1527 during the Sack of Rome, French King Francis I's mother Louise of Savoy inherited the Duchy of Châtellerault, with it reverting to the royal domain after Louise's death in 1531. Subsequently, the Duchy of Châtellerault was given to Charles II de Valois, Duke of Orléans, the third and youngest son of Francis I of France.

François de Bourbon never married but was nevertheless rumored to have had an illegitimate daughter (or natural daughter) named Isabelle de Bourbon (who alleged married a Spaniard named Laurent Suarez, the Count of Corunna), but this has never actually been proven.

References

1492 births
1515 deaths
House of Bourbon
House of Bourbon-Montpensier
House of Capet
Capetian dynasty
French royalty
16th-century peers of France
Dukes of Châtellerault
Military leaders of the Italian Wars
Military personnel killed in action